The men's slalom competition of the Water skiing events at the 2011 Pan American Games in Guadalajara were held from October 21 to October 23 at the Boca Laguna Water Ski Track. The defending champion was Drew Ross of Canada.

Schedule
All times are Central Standard time (UTC-6).

Results

Preliminaries
The top eight qualify for the final.

References

Water skiing at the 2011 Pan American Games